Homeh (also known as Ḩūmeh and Hūmeh) is a village in Poshtkuh-e Mugui Rural District, in the Central District of Fereydunshahr County, Isfahan Province, Iran. At the 2006 census, its population was 103, in 26 families.

References 

Populated places in Fereydunshahr County